(born November 28, 1996) is a Japanese professional wrestler and former idol, currently signed to World Wonder Ring Stardom promotion. She is the current Wonder of Stardom Champion in her first reign. Kamitani is also a former one-time Goddess of Stardom Champion, which she held with Utami Hayashishita.

Early life 
Kamitani had a couple of dancing roles in 2014 as a support dancer. She passed the audition to become a member of the idol group AKB48, however, according to the group's website, she was never listed as a full-time member.

Professional wrestling career

World Wonder Ring Stardom (2018–present) 

With her Idol background, Kamitani debuted in World Wonder Ring Stardom in a non-wrestling role as part of the "Stardom Idols", a dancing and singing group. While the Stardom Idols short-lived, Kamitani passed Stardom's pro-test with Mana Hoshino on July 10, 2019. Kamitani debuted on August 10 at Korakuen Hall where she unsuccessfully challenged Momo Watanabe. On August 18, Kamitani gained her first victory when she teamed with Rina to defeat Queen's Quest (Hina and Leo Onozaki). On November 4, in the official match of the Goddesses of Stardom Tag League match held at the Korakuen Hall tournament, Kamitani and Saya Iida defeated Oedo Tai (Andras Miyagi and Kagetsu), after performing a running "Shooting Star Press" on Miyagi to win for her team. On December 8, Kamitani won the Rookie of Stardom Tournament at Shinkiba 1st Ring Tournament on December 8, where she defeated Iida in the finals.

On February 16, 2020, after Kamitani lost to Utami Hayashishita she joined Queen's Quest. On July 17, Kamitani competed in a three-way match which also involved Iida and Maika for the Future of Stardom Championship, but was unsuccessful. At Stardom Cinderella Tournament 2020 on April 29, Kamitani fell short to Natsuko Tora in the first rounds. On July 26, at the Korakuen Hall competition, Hayashishita and Kamitani won the vacant Goddess of Stardom Championship after defeating the Tokyo Cyber Squad (Jungle Kyona and Konami). At Stardom Yokohama Cinderella 2020 on October 3, Hayashishita and Kamitani had their first successful title defense when they defeated Donna Del Mondo's Himeka and Maika. At Stardom Osaka Dream Cinderella 2020 on December 20, 2020, Kamitani unsuccessfully challenged Saya Iida and Maika for the Future of Stardom Championship. On December 27, Hayashishita and Kamitani lost the Goddess of Stardom Championship to Bea Priestley and Konami, ending their reign at 153 days.

At Stardom 10th Anniversary Show on January 17, 2021, Kamitani teamed up with Momo Watanabe to defeat Himeka and Syuri, Bea Priestley and Saki Kashima, and Mayu Iwatani and Ruaka in a four-way elimination tag team match. On March 3, at All Star Dream Cinderella, Kamitani received her first match for the World of Stardom Championship where she challenged the champion and her ally Hayashishita for the title, but was unsuccessful. On June 12, Kamitani won the 2021 Cinderella Tournament after defeating Maika in the finals. At Yokohama Dream Cinderella 2021 in Summer on July 4, 2021, she unsuccessfully challenged Tam Nakano for the Wonder of Stardom Championship. At the Stardom 5 Star Grand Prix 2021 which took place from July 31 to September 25, Kamitani competed in the "Blue Stars" block where she scored a total of 11 points after going against Syuri, Takumi Iroha, Konami, Utami Hayashishita, Tam Nakano, Maika, Unagi Sayaka and Ruaka. At Stardom 10th Anniversary Grand Final Osaka Dream Cinderella on October 9, 2021, she teamed up with Momo Watanabe and AZM to unsuccessfully challenge Maika, Himeka and Natsupoi for the Artist of Stardom Championship. At the 2021 edition of the Goddesses of Stardom Tag League, Kamitani teamed up with Utami Hayashishita as the Queen's Quest's sub-team of "AphrOditE" where they competed in the "Red Goddess" block, scoring a total of seven points after going against FWC (Hazuki and Koguma), HimePoi '21 (Himeka and Natsupoi), Cosmic Angels (Unagi Sayaka and Mai Sakurai), I love HigashiSpo! (Saki Kashima and Fukigen Death) and Water & Oil (Hanan and Rina). At Kawasaki Super Wars, the first event of the Stardom Super Wars trilogy which took place on November 3, 2021, Kamitani fell short to Mina Shirakawa and Maika in a three-way match. At Tokyo Super Wars on November 27, she defeated Natsupoi and Himeka in a three-way match to become the bumber one contender for the Wonder of Stardom Championship. At Osaka Super Warsm the last event of the trilogy from December 18, she teamed up with AZM, Utami Hayashishita and Momo Watanabe (the leader of Queen's Quest by the time) to fight Oedo Tai's Starlight Kid, Saki Kashima, Konami and Ruaka in an eight-woman elimination tag team match. While down to Kid versus Watanabe, the latter betrayed the stable and attacked AZM with a steel chair to get herself disqualified in a shocking manner to join the enemy team. The former Queen's Quest leader declared that she would be Oedo Tai's black peach. At Stardom Dream Queendom on December 29, 2021, Kamitani defeated Tam Nakano to win the Wonder of Stardom Championship.

At Stardom Nagoya Supreme Fight on January 29, 2022, Kamitani successfully defended the Wonder of Stardom Championship against Mirai. At Stardom Cinderella Journey on February 23, she defended the title successfully again against Natsupoi. At Stardom New Blood 1 on March 11, 2022, Kamitani teamed up with Lady C and went into a time-limit draw against Mirai and Mai Sakurai. On the first night of the Stardom World Climax 2022 from March 26, she defended the title against Utami Hayashishita, and on the second night from March 27, again versus Tam Nakano. At Stardom Cinderella Tournament 2022, she only scored a draw against Maika in the second rounds of April 10. At Stardom Golden Week Fight Tour on May 5, 2022, she defended the Wonder of Stardom Championship successfully against Maika. At Stardom Flashing Champions on May 28, 2022, she defended it again against Mirai. At Stardom Fight in the Top on June 26, 2022, Kamitani teamed up with AZM and Utami Hayashishita and competed in a Six-woman tag team steel cage match where the fell short to Stars (Mayu Iwatani, Koguma and Hazuki). At Mid Summer Champions in Tokyo, the first event of the Stardom Mid Summer Champions series which took place on July 9, 2022, Kamitani defended the "white belt" once again against Starlight Kid. At Mid Summer Champions in Nagoya, the last event from July 24, she defended the title against Saki. At Stardom in Showcase vol.1 on July 23, 2022, Kamitani competed in a three-way casket match against Starlight Kid and Yuu who won the bout after unmasking from a "grim reaper costume". At Stardom x Stardom: Nagoya Midsummer Encounter on August 21, 2022, she defeated Himeka to retain the Wonder of Stardom Championship. Kamitani was initially scheduled to defend against Kairi but the latter pulled out last minute due to COVID issues. At the 2022 edition of the 5 Star Grand Prix which took place between July 30 and October 1, Kamitani competed in the "Blue Stars" block where she scored a total of 14 points after going against Giulia, Mirai, Mayu Iwatani, Suzu Suzuki, Hazuki, Starlight Kid, Natsupoi, Momo Watanabe, Ami Sourei, Mina Shirakawa, Saya Iida and Hanan.

New Japan Pro Wrestling (2021-present)

Kamitani often competes in exhibition matches organized by NJPW in partnership with Stardom. On January 5, 2021, at the second night of New Japan Pro-Wrestling (NJPW)'s Wrestle Kingdom 15, she made her first NJPW appearance where she, alongside AZM and Utami Hayashishita, defeated Himeka, Maika and Natsupoi in a dark match. At Wrestle Grand Slam in MetLife Dome, Kamitani competed in both nights, first on September 4, 2021, where she teamed up with Momo Watanabe to defeat Lady C and Maika, and on September 5, where she teamed again with Watanabe, this time in a losing effort against Donna Del Mondo's Giulia and Syuri.

In other media 
In 2014, Kamitani participated in EXILE's support dancers. She has also experienced a backstage dancer of Team A.

Championships and accomplishments 
 Pro Wrestling Illustrated
 Ranked No. 7 of the top 150 female wrestlers in the PWI Women's 150 in 2022
 Ranked No. 20 of the top 50 tag teams in the PWI Tag Team 50 in 2020 
 World Wonder Ring Stardom
 Wonder of Stardom Championship (1 time, current)
 Goddess of Stardom Championship (1 time) – with Utami Hayashishita
 Cinderella Tournament (2021)
 Rookie of Stardom (2019)
 5★Star GP Award (1 time)
 5★Star GP Best Match Award (2022) – 
 Stardom Year-End Award (3 times)
 Best Tag Team Award (2020) 
 Best Technique Award (2021)
 Outstanding Performance Award (2022)

References 

1996 births
Living people
Japanese female professional wrestlers
Sportspeople from Kanagawa Prefecture
21st-century professional wrestlers
Wonder of Stardom Champions
Goddess of Stardom Champions